Aziziye Mosque or (Aziziye Masjid) is an Ottoman mosque in Konya, Turkey. It is well known for the columned balcony of its minaret, an architectural feature rarely seen in Turkish mosques.

Location
It is situated in the business center of the city.

History
The original Mosque had been commissioned between 1671 and 1676 by Damat Mustafa Pasha who was the husband of Hatice Sultan, the daughter of sultan Mehmet IV. But when it was ruined as a result of a fire in 1867, it was recommissioned by Pertevniyal, the mother of sultan Abdülaziz in 1874. (Name Aziziye refers to Abdülaziz)

Architecture
The mosque was built in the eclectic style of Ottoman architecture that prevailed under the tenure of the Balian architects in the mid-19th century, blending Empire and Neoclassical forms with traditional Ottoman mosque design. It has many features which make it one of a kind. It is a double minaret building. In each minaret the şerefe (balcony) roof is supported with columns which makes the mosque unique in Turkey.  Unlike most other mosques its main floor is elevated and stairs are used to reach the main floor. Also the floorspace is not wide and there is no yard. Because of the same reason Sadirvans (şadırvan, water fountains), are adjacent to minarets. The praying hall is square shaped and its ceiling is a big dome. The nartex has three smaller domes on six marble pillars. Another interesting feature of the Mosque is its windows which are wider than the doors.

Building material
The main building material is cut stone. Bluish marble has been used in the construction of the mihrab and the minbar.

Gallery

References

External links
For images

Mosques in Konya
Ottoman mosques in Konya
19th-century mosques
1676 establishments in the Ottoman Empire
Karatay District
Mosques completed in 1874
Mosque buildings with domes
17th-century mosques
19th-century architecture in Turkey